The Nantucket Blob was a globster that washed ashore on Nantucket Island, Massachusetts, in November 1996. Analysis of samples in 2004 suggests that the Nantucket Blob was a large mass of adipose tissue from a whale.

References

Globsters
1996 in Massachusetts
Nantucket, Massachusetts